This is a list of people who have served as Custos Rotulorum of Nottinghamshire.

 Michael Stanhope bef. 1544–1552
 Sir John Byron, Sr. by 1562–1567.
 Edward Manners, 3rd Earl of Rutland bef. 1573–1587
 John Manners, 4th Earl of Rutland 1587–1588
 Sir Thomas Stanhope  bef. 1594–1596
 William Sutton 1597–1600
 William Cecil, 2nd Earl of Exeter 1600–1640
 William Cavendish, 1st Duke of Newcastle-upon-Tyne 1640–1646
 Interregnum
 William Cavendish, 1st Duke of Newcastle-upon-Tyne 1660–1676
 Henry Cavendish, 2nd Duke of Newcastle-upon-Tyne 1677–1688
 William Pierrepont, 4th Earl of Kingston-upon-Hull 1689–1690
 vacant
 John Holles, 1st Duke of Newcastle-upon-Tyne 1694–1711
For later custodes rotulorum, see Lord Lieutenant of Nottinghamshire.

References

Institute of Historical Research - Custodes Rotulorum 1544-1646
Institute of Historical Research - Custodes Rotulorum 1660-1828

Nottinghamshire